The Cunningham Bridge is a historic structure located northwest of Bevington, Iowa, United States. The Madison County Board of Supervisors contracted with the George E. King Bridge Company of Des Moines to replace an existing span that was to be moved to another site. The wrought iron Pratt pony truss bridge was shipped to the county and erected by June 1886 for $820. The approaches are timber stringer spans, and it is supported by timber pile bents. The bridge was listed on the National Register of Historic Places in 1998.

References

Bridges completed in 1886
Bridges in Madison County, Iowa
National Register of Historic Places in Madison County, Iowa
Road bridges on the National Register of Historic Places in Iowa
Truss bridges in Iowa
Wrought iron bridges in the United States
Pratt truss bridges in the United States